Gosha Levochkin (born April 28, 1986) is a New York artist working in the tradition of ligne claire. He has exhibited works in Los Angeles, New York City, and Munich. He was born in Moscow, in the former Soviet Union, in Hospital #2.

Early life and education 
He spent the first 10 years of his childhood in Moscow, during the difficult times associated with the fall of the Soviet Union. His mother was born in Tbilisi, Georgia, his father was from Moscow. They both were professional violinists who played in professional orchestras in the Soviet Union. They lived four blocks away from the Red Square. When his parents separated, he and his mother immigrated to Los Feliz, a neighborhood in Los Angeles, California. There, he hung out with skateboarders and within the LA punk rock scene.

He is self-taught. Instead of formal art school, he studied graffiti, comic books, and Japanese animation. The artist, Rob Sato, had a great impact on his work and his technique. He worked for 5 years at Blue Rooster Art Supplies, an art boutique in Los Feliz.

Career 
“Going Places” (2010), a solo exhibition at C.A.V.E. Gallery was the first series that influenced all the series that follow. Its theme is traveling. Then “Cluster Mess" (2011) garnered attention in the Los Angeles art scene. He plays with balance in an attempt to showcase elements of chaos. Another work ‘Seasonal Changes” (2013) marks the time when he became a professional artist. He finally rented an apartment, quit his boutique job, to completely devote himself to art.

Arts activism 
Gosha started Dirty hands, an art school in the Lower East Side of Manhattan. Dirty Hands offers art education unavailable in traditional art school settings. It offers new approaches to contemporary art such as “tapeshit,” a tutorial on making clean shapes in painting. He wanted to share what he has learned and work collaboratively with others.

References

External links 
 http://www.levochkingosha.com/
 https://www.dirtyhands.work/

1986 births
Living people
Artists from New York City
American people of Russian descent
People from Los Feliz, Los Angeles